VIVA Hungary was a Hungarian pay television music channel that was launched on 27 June 1997 as Z+. Like its sister channels MTV and VH1, VIVA Hungary featured localised music videos, programming, presenters and chart shows. It shut down on October 3, 2017, replaced by the local version of MTV Hits (Europe).

Programmes
 VIVA VEKKER
 VIVA SOUNDS
 VIVA NIGHT SOUNDS
 PARTY SOUNDS
 MEGÁLLÓ
 RANDOMMARCI
 MAYO CHIX DIVATVILÁG
 EGYTŐL HÁROM!
 SZÜLINAP LUXUSKIVITELBEN
 PLAIN JANE
 SPONGYABOB KOCKANADRÁG
 VIVA INTERAKTÍV
 VIVA CHART SHOW
 HAZAI PÁLYA (LOCAL CHART)
 VIVA ONLINE CHART
 US CHART
 UK CHART
 WORLD STAGE
 CHILLOUT ZONE
 NAPI TOP 10
 RANDIKOMMANDÓ
 ÚT A CSÚCSRA
 Presenters:
 VJ Ada (2003−2010)
 VJ Ben (2008−2010)
 VJ Zola (2006−2011)
 VJ Eszti (2010–2017)
 VJ Marci(2011–2012)
 Sanyóca (only in Megálló, 2012–2014)
 Pizsu (2012-2015)
 Marcell (2012-2017)

References

External links
 

Television networks in Hungary
VIVA (TV station)
Television channels and stations established in 1997
Television channels and stations disestablished in 2017
1997 establishments in Hungary
2017 disestablishments in Hungary